Alibi is a British pay television channel that was launched on 1 November 1997 as UK Arena. It was renamed UK Drama in 2000, and then UKTV Drama in 2004, and assumed its current name on 7 October 2008.

History
The channel originally launched as part of the new four channel UKTV network on 1 November 1997. The channel, originally named UK Arena, focused on arts programming and was named after the BBC's flagship arts programme Arena (The BBC, through BBC Worldwide, owning half of UKTV and therefore half the channel). The channel aired as a part-time service, airing from 7pm-7am every day.

However, following disappointing ratings, the channel's focus was broadened to include all drama series, and as a result was renamed UK Drama on 31 March 2000. Within the launch of UK Food on 5 November 2001, UK Drama began timesharing with the new channel at the same broadcast hours. By 2002, UK Drama's broadcast hours were reduced to 9pm-5am.
 
On 8 March 2004, the channel, alongside all other UKTV channels, was renamed UKTV Drama to increase awareness of the central UKTV brand. On 9 April 2005, UKTV announced that the channel would expand to a full 24-hour schedule on 30 May.

Following the successful relaunch and rebranding of the channel UKTV G2 as Dave on 15 October 2007, the remaining UKTV channels underwent the same changes. UKTV Drama was renamed Alibi on 7 October 2008, and the channel's programmes were changed to focus specifically on crime dramas. All non-crime dramas were transferred to the rebranded Gold channel or to the newly created flagship channel Watch.

Subsidiary channels

Alibi +1
Alongside the main channel, a time shift channel is also operated: Alibi +1. Corresponding to the name on the main channel shows all programming from the channel one hour later, with no special idents or continuity used.

It originally launched on Sky on 2 May 2006 as UKTV Drama +1. Unlike its main service which broadcast around the clock, the timeshift only operated as a part-time service that broadcast from 3pm-2am. The channel was added to Virgin Media on 23 October 2007.

Alibi HD
On 29 July 2011, UKTV announced that it had secured a deal with BSkyB to launch three more high-definition channels on Sky. As part of Virgin Media's deal to sell its share of UKTV, all five of UKTV's HD channels would also be added to Virgin's cable television service by 2012. Alibi HD launched on 3 July 2012 on Sky and Virgin Media, while Dave HD and Watch HD launched in October 2011. All three channels are HD simulcasts of the standard-definition channels.

On-air identity

When the channel launched on 1 November 1997, the idents featured a star shape, usually inside a circle, with the UK Arena logo below. The logo, like that of all the UKTV channels until 2001, featured a single straight line logo with the UK prefix in a white box and the channel name typed in Gill Sans above a line extending out from the box. When the channel rebranded to UK Drama on 31 March 2000, the idents remained the same, with a change of the colours and the logo the only noticeable differences.

A new design introduced on 7 May 2001 resulted in the UK Drama logo standing alone at the bottom of the screen in a bold text, stylised to appear as: "UK Drama". On the end of the logo, a small design was included. One was assigned to each channel, with the exception of UK Gold and UK Gold 2, to identify what the channel broadcast. In the case of UK Drama, it was a bold, eight pointed star within a circle. The idents themselves were replaced by three men beating drums with water on the surface with each drummer bathed in a particular colour light: red, blue and green. A subsequent name change to UKTV Drama saw the logo with an uppercase 'DRAMA' below a UKTV logo which was aligned to the left of the screen, a predominantly purple colour scheme, and idents that featured a giant glass appearing 'D', which used from 30 May 2005 to 6 October 2008.

Following the rebrand to Alibi on 7 October 2008, the channel's idents were all accompanied by the Alibi logo, seen with interchangeable colours of white, black and red, and featured words associated with crime and murder arranged into different shapes; the outline of a dead body, a gunshot shattering a pane of glass, the dials of a safe, and the beam from a torch illuminating the words.

On 1 July 2015, Alibi had its first rebrand for seven years, with a slight change to the overall look and feel. The channel's red identity was made slightly darker while the logo stayed circular with white font, no dot over the first "i" and a black dot over the second. New idents feature crime scenes with the camera following red string that joins the clues together before resolving into the new logo.

Programming
The output of the channel is a combination of drama series and serials comprising first-run exclusive and second run shows from the United States and Canada, together with second run showings of shows from the BBC and ITV.

Original programming

Drama
 Annika (original series)
 Traces (2 seasons, 12 episodes) (Alibi original series) (Renewed)
 We Hunt Together (2 seasons, 12 episodes) (Alibi original series)(Renewed)
 Clarice

Co-production
 Inspector George Gently

Current
 The Bad Seed (New Zealand import from TVNZ 1)
 Bite Club (Australian import from Nine Network)
 CSI:Vegas
 Death in Paradise (also shown on Drama)
 The Doctor Blake Mysteries (Australian import from ABC (Australia)) (also shown on Drama)
 Doctor Foster
 Evil (US import from Paramount+)
 Father Brown (also shown on Drama) and spin-off Sister Boniface Mysteries
 Frankie Drake Mysteries (Canadian import/UKTV co-production with CBC Television)
 Harrow (Australian import from ABC (Australia))
 Hudson & Rex (Canadian import from CBC)
 Luther
 Miss Fisher's Murder Mysteries (Australian import from ABC (Australia))
 Miss Marple (also shown on Drama)
 Miss Scarlet and The Duke
 Ms Fisher's Modern Murder Mysteries (Australian import from Seven Network)
 Murdoch Mysteries (Canadian import/UKTV co-production with Citytv/CBC)
 New Tricks (also shown on Drama)
 One of Us (Australian Import)
 Ragdoll (American import/UKTV co–production with AMC+)
 Rizzoli & Isles (US import from TNT)
 Pretty Hard Cases (Canadian import)
 Shakespeare & Hathaway: Private Investigators
 Shetland (also shown on Drama)
 Silent Witness (also shown on Drama)
 Strike
 Taggart (STV)

Previous on Alibi

 1-800-Missing (Canadian import from W Network)
 55 Degrees North
 Bergerac (now on Drama)
 The Bill (ITV) (now on W and Drama)
 Body of Proof (US import from ABC)
 Cagney and Lacey (US import from CBS)
 Campion
 Castle (US import from ABC)
 The Closer (US import from TNT)
 Criminal Minds: Beyond Borders (US import from CBS)
 Criminal Minds: Suspect Behaviour (US import from CBS)
 Crossing Lines
 Dalziel and Pascoe (now on Drama)
 Dangerfield (now on Drama)
 Detective Conan (Japanese import from TMS Entertainment; presented in Japanese with English subtitles)
 Diagnosis: Murder (US import from CBS, now on CBS Justice)
 Doctor Who (broadcast during 2008 as a special season presenting all of Tom Baker's episodes)
 Due South (Canadian import from CTV, US import from CBS, now on Sony Channel)
 Deception
 Father Dowling Mysteries (US import from NBC/ABC)
 The Glades (US import from A&E)
 The Guardian (US import from CBS)
 Hamish Macbeth (now on Drama)
 Hart to Hart (US import from ABC, now on Sony Channel)
 Hetty Wainthropp Investigates (now on Drama)
 Hunter
 The Inspector Alleyn Mysteries
 The Inspector Lynley Mysteries (now on Drama)
 Jack Taylor (Irish import from TV3)
 Jonathan Creek (now on Drama)
 Judge John Deed (now on Drama)
 King & Maxwell (US import from TNT)
 The Last Detective (ITV)
 Lie to Me (US import from Fox) (previously on Sky One)
 Maisie Raine (now on Drama)
 The Missing
 The Mrs. Bradley Mysteries (now on Drama)
 My Life Is Murder (Australian import from Network Ten)
 Murder in Mind
 Murder, She Wrote (US import from CBS, now on 5USA)
 Perception (US import from TNT)
 The Protector (US import from Lifetime)
 Quantico (US import from ABC)
 Rebus (ITV) (now on Drama)
 Rush (Australian import from Network Ten)
 Reckless (US import from CBS)
 Republic of Doyle (Canadian import from CBC, now on Fox)
 Return of the Saint (ITV)
 Ripper Street (now on Drama)
 The Rockford Files
 Rosewood (US import from Fox)
 The Saint (ITV)
 Secrets and Lies (US import from ABC)
 Sherlock
 Shoestring
 Spooks (BBC) (now on Drama)
 Stumptown
 Sue Thomas: F.B. Eye (US import from PAX)
 Tommy
 Ten Days in the Valley (US import from ABC)
 Unforgettable (US import from CBS/A&E) (previously on Sky Living)
 Waking the Dead (now on Drama)
 Wallander
 Whiskey Cavalier
 Why Women Kill (US import from Paramount+)
 WPC 56

See also
 UKTV
 Television in the United Kingdom

References

External links
 
 UKTV at The TV Room
 Alibi at TVARK

Television channels and stations established in 1997
UKTV
UKTV channels
Crime television networks